Kodikkalpalayam is a part of Thiruvarur Town, it comes Under the Ward no:7 and 8 partly 9 and 10 in Thiruvarur municipality.  Tamil Nadu, India.

Location
It is located 2 kilometers away (north) from the district headquarters Thiruvarur. KodikkalPalayam is a township area covered under Thiruvarur municipality, a district of Tamil Nadu in India. It is located 2 km from Thiruvarur, 25 km from Nagapattinam, 40 km from Kumbakonam & Mayiladudurai and 60 km from Thanjavur. The nearest airport is at Tiruchirapalli\Karaikkal and the nearest railway station is at Thiruvarur Junction. The port of Nagapattinam is located 25 km away from part of town.

Profession of the people
Most of the people living here seek jobs in abroad and the others run petty shops in & around the village. Until last decade, 80 percent of students did abstain themselves from pursuing higher education and they opted for jobs in gulf countries to meet their financial needs. Surprisingly, the perception has been changed and the importance of education has been realized by the younger generations. Nowadays the younger generations are more than willing to complete their degrees and go beyond that.

Beliefs
This region of the district mostly covered by the followers of Islam. However the region also contains peoples of other religion and tribes of people. The history of this region was stated in the book Sirar Kodinagar written by Mr. Eliyasin Ishaq who was the second well-known graduate from the village.

History of Kodikkalpalayam has the long view in the history of thiruvarur where the area was ruled by a king named cholan during the period followers of Islam settled in a place which is now called Kodikkalpalayam.

The Vast area of this region was called by the name of this village because of its cultivation of The betel (Piper betal) Vethalai/ Vetrilai in Tamil  shortly as Vetrilai  kodi where the name of this village came to known as kodikalpalayam.

In ancient time the village was covered till the new Electricity Board office and still the village has few property in this region.

The commonly followed religion is Islam. There are four masjids located in this part of town.

Schools
There are three schools providing education in this part of Town. Government higher secondary school started 1975 become high school to upgraded 2007 higher secondary school, Now the students are also studying in English medium. In one municipal primary school and Pallivasal jamath owned mathalpul kairath nursery and primary school started 2002 now future plan girls' high school establish soon.
In old Arabic madarsa formed matharasa mathalapul kairath

Post office

In 1915 started post office in kodikkalpalayam 610001. 100 years completed this year. On 22 January 2015 celebrate special stamp expo conduct mathalapul kairath school & Thiruvarur town stamp collection assiocation. Special live coverage For leading Tamil news channel Puthiyathalaimurai from 10 a.m to 10.30 a.m. KEIA also celebrated special seminar for post office 100 years.

Villages in Tiruvarur district